Lars Løkke Rasmussen  (born 15 May 1964) is a Danish politician who has served as Minister of Foreign Affairs since 2022. He previously served as the 25th Prime Minister of Denmark from 2009 to 2011 and again from 2015 to 2019. He was the leader of the liberal Venstre party from 2009 to 2019.

Rasmussen has been a member of the Folketing since 21 September 1994. He also served as County Mayor of Frederiksborg County from 1998 to 2001. Subsequently, he was the Interior and Health Minister from 27 November 2001 to 23 November 2007 as part of Anders Fogh Rasmussen's first and second cabinets, and then Minister of Finance from 23 November 2007 to April 2009 as part of Anders Fogh Rasmussen's third cabinet. On 5 April 2009, he succeeded Anders Fogh Rasmussen as Prime Minister following the latter's appointment as Secretary General of NATO.

In the 2011 general election, the government lost its parliamentary majority and Rasmussen tendered the government's resignation to Queen Margrethe II. He was succeeded by Helle Thorning-Schmidt of the Social Democrats on 3 October 2011. In the 2015 general election, the right-wing parties regained a majority in the Folketing. Rasmussen again became Prime Minister and formed his second cabinet in the same month. This cabinet was made up exclusively of Venstre members, but in November 2016 he was pressured to also include members of Liberal Alliance and Conservative People's Party, forming his third cabinet.

On 6 June 2019, he resigned from his position as prime minister after a general election, in which his government was defeated. However, he continued to lead a caretaker government until a new government was formed and sworn in. This was completed on 27 June 2019 and Rasmussen was succeeded as Prime Minister by Mette Frederiksen. He resigned as the chairman of Venstre in August 2019, and left the party in January 2021. He subsequently formed the Moderates, which campaigned on ending bloc politics, and won 16 seats in the 2022 Danish general election.

Early life
Lars Løkke Rasmussen was born in Vejle to Jeppe Rasmussen and Lise Løkke Rasmussen. His last name is Rasmussen, while Løkke is his middle name.

He graduated from high school in 1983, and was the president of the youth branch of Venstre from 1986 to 1989. He graduated with a law degree (cand. jur) from the University of Copenhagen in 1992. From 1990 to 1995 he worked as a self-employed consultant.

Lars Løkke Rasmussen is married to Sólrun Løkke Rasmussen (née Sólrun Jákupsdóttir). Together they have three children.

Political career

Venstres Ungdom chairmanship and Afghanistan mission
Lars Løkke Rasmussen served as chairman of the youth branch of Venstre from 1986 to 1989. One of his initiatives was to establish an alternative to Operation Dagsværk — an annual one day fundraising campaign by high school students collecting money for third world countries — since Operation Dagsværk at the time was spearheaded by members of the Danish Communist Youth. Rasmussen's campaign was supported by the party youth branch, and raised 600,000 DKK which were spent on school equipment in Soviet occupied Afghanistan. Lars Løkke Rasmussen led a Danish delegation to Afghanistan delivering the collected funds, and a photograph taken by photographer Jørn Stjerneklar shows him and two other delegation members disguised as Afghans. Another photo shows him holding an AK-47, while standing together with three Mujahideen. The photos have generated a lot of media attention in Denmark, after the Danish participation in the war in Afghanistan and especially as Rasmussen moved up the rankings at Venstre.

County Mayor and deputy chairman of Venstre
Rasmussen was elected deputy chairman of Venstre in 1998, at the same time as Anders Fogh Rasmussen assumed the position as party leader after Uffe Ellemann-Jensen. In 1998, he was elected as county mayor of Frederiksborg County, a position he occupied until 2001, when he joined the first Fogh Rasmussen cabinet.

Minister of the Interior and Health
Lars Løkke Rasmussen served as Interior and Health Minister between 2001 and 2007 until he was appointed Minister of Finance in 2007. He was responsible for negotiating a 2002 agreement between Venstre, the Conservatives, the Social Democrats and the Danish People's Party giving patients in public hospitals the right to select a private hospital, provided that the public hospital had been unable to treat the patient within two months.  In 2007, this time limit was lowered to one month. Since 2002, the government has awarded extra funds earmarked at reducing the waiting list at National Health Service hospitals, a grant sometimes referred to by the media as Løkkeposen (A pun on 'lykkepose' the Danish word for a goodie bag). He also represented the government during negotiations regarding a reform of the system by which richer municipalities transfer part of their tax incomes to poorer municipalities.

Municipal reform of 2007
As Minister of the Interior and Health, Lars Løkke Rasmussen spearheaded the municipal reform that reduced Denmark's 271 municipalities to 98, and abolished the 14 counties and replaced them with five regions.

Minister of Finance
After then Prime Minister Anders Fogh Rasmussen won his second reelection in 2007 he created his third cabinet in which Lars Løkke Rasmussen was appointed Minister of Finance. This was seen as a clear indicator that Rasmussen was next in line to follow Fogh as leader of Venstre and Prime Minister, when Fogh would leave Danish politics.
As Finance Minister Lars Løkke Rasmussen led the negotiations concerning funds to banks hit by the global financial crisis.

Tax reform of 2009
In February 2009, Lars Løkke Rasmussen was the chief negotiator in the political agreement behind a major tax reform, implementing the government's ambition of reducing income tax and increasing taxes on pollution. The reform was, according to Lars Løkke Rasmussen, the biggest reduction of the marginal tax rate since the introduction of the income tax in 1903. The opposition accused it of being historically skewed in favouring those with high-income jobs and giving very little to those with low-income jobs.

Prime Minister of Denmark

On 4 April 2009, NATO decided that Prime Minister Anders Fogh Rasmussen would replace Jaap de Hoop Scheffer as Secretary General of NATO. On the same day, Anders Fogh Rasmussen declared that he would resign as Prime Minister on 5 April 2009. As deputy of the largest party in the government, Lars Løkke Rasmussen thus took over the post as Prime Minister of Denmark. An opinion poll released on the day of Lars Løkke Rasmussen's takeover revealed that Danes believed that he only beat Helle Thorning-Schmidt as the person best suited for bringing Denmark through the financial crisis, and that Thorning-Schmidt would have been better suited to combatting unemployment, reducing hospital waiting lists, securing the welfare society of the future, and representing Denmark internationally. On 7 April 2009, Lars Løkke Rasmussen announced the new set of ministers in his Cabinet.

COP15 - December 2009
Lars Løkke Rasmussen has been sharply criticized from many sides for his handling of the COP15 leadership.

At the first meeting of the summit high level section, led by Lars Løkke Rasmussen, a number of countries protested the Danish handling of the negotiations. ”We cannot continue to talk about procedure. We must move forward. The World awaits us”, said Lars Løkke Rasmussen responding to criticism of the Danish led negotiations coming from several countries who regarded them as undemocratic.

Many developing countries viewed this statement as arrogant. Procedure is a major element in UN negotiations. ”This is not about procedure. This is about content. We have stated that the results in Copenhagen must come in two texts. One cannot simply present a text pulled from the clouds”, replied the Chinese delegate in the auditorium.

Stanislaus Lumumba Di-Aping, chief negotiator for the Developing Nations' organisation G77, cross examined what exactly Rasmussen meant when stating that the chairmen of the negotiating groups should be "people whom we trust". Criticism of the Office of the Prime Minister was supported by China, India and Brazil. The last had been regarded as an ally by the Danish delegation.

The international press, too, has been severe in its criticism of the Prime Minister and the Prime Minister's Office. The BBC's climate correspondent stated: "According to all my sources, the Prime Minister's Office is on the verge of a melt-down. They have no modus operandi, or the diplomatic experience needed to plan one in advance. Ed Miliband, the UK Secretary of State for Energy and Climate Change, was quoted for stating that "Denmark is doing a reasonable job".

Budget cuts

In May 2010 Rasmussen's government announced major spending cuts and measures designed to increase revenues, notably to unemployment insurance (cut from a maximum of four years to two), foreign aid (cut from 0.83% of GDP to 0.76%), cuts to child support payments, and miscellaneous tax reforms designed to increase revenues. The cuts were designed to save the government 24 billion DKK.

2011 election

Rasmussen led Venstre in the September 2011 parliamentary election. He sought to renew the mandate of the rightwing coalition that had been in power since 2001. Although his party gained a seat, the opposition parties combined obtained more seats than the parties supporting the incumbent government. On 16 September 2011, Rasmussen tendered the government's resignation to Queen Margrethe. He remained in office as head of a caretaker government until his successor, Helle Thorning-Schmidt, was appointed on 3 October 2011.

2015 election and return to government

Rasmussen led Venstre in the June 2015 general election. His Blue Bloc won a tight election in which his party came third overall, winning Rasmussen the ability to form a government.

All members of Lars Løkke Rasmussen's second Cabinet, composed solely of members of Venstre, were sworn in on 28 June 2015 in the Danish Parliament. , his Cabinet consists of seventeen ministers.

In 2015, Rasmussen denied US Senator Bernie Sanders's characterization of Denmark as socialist, noting that the nation had a market economy.

On 28 November 2016 Rasmussen presented Lars Løkke Rasmussen III Cabinet, composed of members of Venstre, Conservative People's Party and Liberal Alliance.

On 31 May 2018 it was announced that Denmark would be banning full-face veils.

After premiership

2019 general election

Though Venstre made the largest gains of any party in the 2019 general election, support for the Danish People's Party and Liberal Alliance collapsed, costing Rasmussen his majority. With the result beyond doubt on election night, Rasmussen conceded defeat to the "red bloc" under the Social Democrats' Mette Frederiksen. On 6 June 2019, he announced his resignation. On 31 August 2019, Rasmussen resigned from his position as the chairman of Venstre party following weeks of pressure from party members.

Leader of the Moderates 

In 2021 Rasmussen founded a new party, the Moderates. In the 2022 Danish general election, the Moderates became the third largest party winning 16 seats. Rasmussen himself received 38,439 personal votes.

Controversies

Tax spending 
Rasmussen has on several occasions been accused of spending tax payer money on himself and his family. In the spring of 2008, he was accused by the media - essentially the Danish tabloid Ekstra Bladet - of having charged his official accounts with considerable expenses he should have paid himself, e.g. restaurants, cigarettes, taxis, and hotels, both as county mayor and as minister. All of this has been well documented, according to several independent media sources, although all charges were dropped and there was never a court trial. It was something that was according to the rules of the party Venstre. In May 2007, Rasmussen was again accused by Ekstra Bladet of having his ministry pay for a hotel room in Copenhagen when he privately attended a Paul McCartney concert in Horsens in 2004. Since the many serious scandals surrounding Rasmussen were brought to the attention of the public, Venstre has suffered in the polls.

Global Green Growth 
In 2013, the Global Green Growth Institute (GGGI) was criticized by two member countries for its financial management: Norway withheld $10 million in donations, citing excessive spending on flights and food by GGGI former Council Chairman Lars Løkke Rasmussen, and both Norway and Denmark demanded an Audit of the organization's finances before renewing support for 2014. Rasmussen was, as the chairman, accused of being greedy, while the other members of GGGI were not accused.

School pressure 
In 2018, Rasmussen's wife was about to get fired and was called to a meeting with the leader of the school where she worked. Rasmussen, as his wife's civil assessor, came to the meeting, along with his bodyguards. His wife was fired at the meeting. The case resulted in criticism because Rasmussen's position as Prime Minister could be perceived as inappropriate pressure on the school leader and in similar meetings it is usually the union representative that functions as the civil assessor.

Honours

National honours
 :
 Commander 1st Class of the Order of the Dannebrog (2009)

Foreign honours

 :
 Knight Grand Cross of the Order of the Crown (2017) 
 :
 Grand Cross of the National Order of Merit (2018)
 :
 Grand Cross of the Order of the Phoenix (2009)
 :
 Grand Cross of the Order of the Falcon (2017)
 :
 Sash of Special Category of the Order of the Aztec Eagle (2016)
 :
 Grand Gwanghwa Medal of the Order of Diplomatic Service (2011)

References

External links

 
 

|-

|-

|-

|-

|-

|-

|-

|-

|-

1964 births
Commanders First Class of the Order of the Dannebrog
Grand Crosses of the Order of the Crown (Belgium)
Grand Crosses of the Order of the Phoenix (Greece)
Knights Grand Cross of the Order of the Falcon
Prime Ministers of Denmark
Danish Health Ministers
Danish Finance Ministers
Danish Interior Ministers
Living people
People from Vejle Municipality
University of Copenhagen alumni
Venstre (Denmark) politicians
Members of the Folketing 1994–1998
Members of the Folketing 1998–2001
Members of the Folketing 2001–2005
Members of the Folketing 2005–2007
Members of the Folketing 2007–2011
Members of the Folketing 2011–2015
Members of the Folketing 2015–2019
Members of the Folketing 2019–2022
Members of the Folketing 2022–2026
Leaders of political parties in Denmark
Leaders of Venstre (Denmark)
Moderates (Denmark) politicians